Ferret Music was an American independent record label turned Warner Music Group subsidiary, founded in 1996. The label is owned by NORA's vocalist, Carl Severson, and based in West Windsor, New Jersey. Ferret recently started an imprint called New Weathermen Records. Warner Music Group's Alternative Distribution Alliance acquired a stake in Ferret Music in August, 2006,
and as a result is currently distributed by Fontana Distribution, Alternative Distribution Alliance and eOne Music.

As of September 12, 2007, Ferret partnered with an uprising extreme metal and hardcore punk label out of the UK, Siege of Amida Records (S.O.A.R.). S.O.A.R will retain A&R responsibilities. On February 18, 2010 Carl Severson and his business partner at Ferret and ChannelZERO, Paul Conroy, announced their departure from the company to start Good Fight Entertainment, a management company with music and sports divisions along with a new record label. Ferret's official website was last updated in 2009, adding to speculation that the label is defunct. According to Scott Mellinger, lead guitarist for Zao, Ferret Records sold to Warner Music while Severson went on to start Good Fight.

Past artists
 36 Crazyfists (active, on Spinefarm Records)
 A Life Once Lost (disbanded)
 A Static Lullaby (active, unsigned)
 All Chrome (disbanded)
 Annotations of an Autopsy (active, unsigned)
 Blood Has Been Shed (disbanded)
 Boris The Blade (disbanded)
 Boys Night Out (active, with Good Fight Music)
 Burnt by the Sun (disbanded)
 blessthefall (active, on Rise Records)
 Cataract (disbanded)
 Chimaira (disbanded)
 Dead Hearts (disbanded)
 Disembodied (active, on Good Fight Music)
 The Devil Wears Prada (active, on Solid State Records)
 Elysia (disbanded)
 Eternal Lord (disbanded)
 Every Time I Die (disbanded)
 For the Love of... (active)
 Foxy Shazam (active, with I.R.S. Records)
 From Autumn to Ashes (active, unsigned)
 Full Blown Chaos (active on Ironclad Recordings)
 Funeral for a Friend
 Gwen Stacy (disbanded)
 Harvest (active)
 Heavy Heavy Low Low (disbanded)
 Hellmouth (active, on Paper+Plastick Records)
 In Flames (active, with Nuclear Blast Records)
 Ice Nine Kills (active, with Fearless Records)
 Johnny Truant (disbanded)
 Killswitch Engage (active, with Metal Blade Records)
 Knights of the Abyss (on hiatus since 2012)
 Luddite Clone (disbanded)
 Ligeia (on hiatus)
 LoveHateHero (disbanded)
 Lower Definition (disbanded)
 Madball (active, with Good Fight Music)
 Martyr A.D. (disbanded)
 Maylene and the Sons of Disaster (active, Independent)
 Misery Signals (active, with Basick Records)
 NORA (active, with Good Fight Music)
 Poison the Well (on hiatus)
 Remembering Never (active, with Dead Truth Recordings)
 Revolution Mother (on hiatus)
 Scarlet (on hiatus)
 See You Next Tuesday (Active, unsigned)
 Shadows Fall (on hiatus)
 Skycamefalling (disbanded)
 Suicide Note (disbanded)
 The Banner (active, with Good Fight Music)
 The Break (disbanded)
 The Bronx (active, with White Drugs)
 The Hottness (disbanded)
 The Rise (active, with ReIgnition Records)
 Torn Apart (active, unsigned)
 Twelve Tribes (disbanded)
Union (disbanded)
 Underneath the Gun (disbanded)
 Upon Disfigurement (on hiatus)
 xBishopx (active, with Dead Truth Recordings)
 Waking the Cadaver (active, with Unique Leader Records)
 Zao (active, currently unsigned)

S.O.A.R. artists
 Against the Flood
 Ageless Oblivion
 Annotations of an Autopsy (Also on Nuclear Blast)
 Ancient Ascendant
 Armed for Apocalypse
 As They Burn
 Awaken Demons
 Belial
 Betraeus
 Cult Cinema
 Dead Beyond Buried
 Demoraliser
 Diskreet
 Dripback
 Dyscarnate
 Eradication
 Heart in Hand
 Ingested
 Malevolence
 Martyr Defiled
 The Breathing Process
 The Bridal Procession
 TRC
 Waking The Cadaver

Past S.O.A.R Artists
 A Girl a Gun a Ghost (disbanded)
 Belie My Burial (active, unsigned)
 Chaos Blood (disbanded)
 Chase the Sunset (formerly known as Endurance of Hate)(Active, Unsigned)
 Clone the Fragile (disbanded)
 Dignity Dies First (disbanded)
 Forever Never (active, Unsigned)
 Impending Doom (active, with eONE music)
 Implosive Disgorgence (disbanded)
 Knights of the Abyss (disbanded)
 Last House on the Left (Active, Unsigned)
 My Cross to Bare (reformed 2021)
 Rose Funeral (active, with Metal Blade Records)
 The Adept (active, unsigned)
 The Irish Front (disbanded)
 The Partisan Turbine (disbanded)
 The Plasmarifle (active, unsigned)
 The Red Death (disbanded)
 The Red Shore (disbanded)
 Titans (disbanded)
 Viatrophy (disbanded)
 Wecamewithbrokenteeth (disbanded in 2008, reformed in 2009 and then disbanded again in 2010)
 Whitechapel (active, with Metal Blade Records)

See also
 List of record labels

References

Other sources
Warner Music Group news release August 7, 2006
Martens, Todd, "Ferret's New Partner", Billboard, 00062510, September 2, 2006, Vol. 118, Issue 35

External links
 

American independent record labels
Defunct record labels of the United States
Record labels established in 1996
Heavy metal record labels
Alternative rock record labels
West Windsor, New Jersey
New Jersey record labels
Mass media in New Jersey
1996 establishments in New Jersey